BirdLife Australia is a not-for-profit organisation advocating for native birds and the conservation of their habitats across Australia.

BirdLife Australia is the trading name of the company limited by guarantee formed through the merger of two Australian non-government conservation organisations, Bird Observation and Conservation Australia (BOCA) and Birds Australia. A constitution was drafted in May 2011 for BirdLife Australia, which became operational on 1 January 2012. Their respective magazines, the Bird Observer and Wingspan, were succeeded by Australian Birdlife.

History
At simultaneous annual general meetings held on 21 May 2011, the respective members of BOCA and Birds Australia voted to merge and form the new company. Over 93% of those that voted from BOCA voted for the merger and over 95% of those that voted from Birds Australia voted for the merger. A combined total of 4517 Birds Australia and BOCA members voted on the resolution, with over 36% of Birds Australia members and more than 50% of BOCA members voting. This was the biggest response to a proposed resolution that either organisation had ever received.

With the merger, BirdLife Australia became the Australian national partner organisation of BirdLife International, a role hitherto performed by Birds Australia.

The inaugural Board of Directors was made up of five board members from each of the merging organisations, with the addition of a "neutral" chair, Gerard Early, who continues to serve as a board member.

The inaugural chief executive officer (CEO), Dr Graeme Hamilton, resigned in October 2012. Hamilton had served as CEO of Birds Australia from 2005 to 2011, and also as CEO of BOCA in its final months of operation in 2011. James O'Connor served as interim CEO from October 2012, until the appointment of Paul Sullivan in January 2013.

Constitution
The constitution of BirdLife Australia is loosely based on the constitutions of the merging bodies. The organisation is member-based, and board members are elected by the membership at an annual general meeting. The constitution also describes a transitional period for the board for its first three years of operation, whereby two members of each original board will stand down at each annual general meeting.

Operations
BirdLife Australia's current national office is at 60 Leicester Street Carlton, Victoria, at the site of the former Birds Australia office. The office of BOCA was in Nunawading, Victoria, and was still owned by BirdLife Australia. The organisation operates the Birdlife Discovery Centre at Sydney Olympic Park in Homebush, New South Wales, and leases premises in Floreat, West Australia.

BirdLife Australia owns and operates Gluepot Reserve, a  reserve for bird conservation and research in the South Australian semi-arid mallee region, and leases two bird observatories in West Australia, the Broome Bird Observatory and the Eyre Bird Observatory.

BirdLife Australia runs a number of research, monitoring and conservation programs related to Australian birds, and these are often characterised by a significant volunteer input. The Atlas of Australian Birds Project is a national bird monitoring project involving hundreds of skilled bird observers submitting survey data from across the country. This data is used in national reporting, notably State of Australia's Birds reports. Birdata is the gateway to BirdLife Australia data including the Atlas of Australian Birds and Nest record scheme. Datasets from this activity are publicly accessible.

Other large scale monitoring and conservation efforts include Shorebirds 2020, a national migratory shorebirds program, and the Beach-nesting Birds program, aimed at improving the conservation status of resident shorebirds through research, adaptive management and community engagement.

Other projects, including Birds in Backyards and the Aussie Backyard Bird Count have more of an engagement and education focus. More recently (2017-2019), these projects and programs have been amalgamated into larger programs, including the Urban Birds Program (incorporating the Birds in Backyards program, the Woodland Bird Program (incorporating projects such as Birds on Farms and the Regent Honeyeater Recovery Project), the Coast and Marine Program (incorporating the Beach Nesting Birds program, as well as new programs including the Preventing Extinctions program. These programs are increasingly guided and informed by Conservation Action Planning.

The Bushfire Recovery program aims to improve conservation outcomes for Australian birds impacted by the 2019–20 bush fires, with a focus on threatened species most imperilled by the fires.

Together with Charles Darwin University, Birdlife Australia created the Action Plan for Australian Birds 2020. According to the plan, there were 216 threatened birds in Australia compared to 195 ten years ago. The plan, published by CSIRO Publishing, was written by more than 300 experts and edited by CDU Conservation Professor Stephen Garnett and Dr Barry Baker, and reports on a decade of monitoring and assessment of the populations of Australian birds. The report outlines instructions on how to avoid further decline of bird populations.

Regional groups 
Birds Australia Northern NSW (BANN) is a regional group of Birds Australia based in northern New South Wales. BANN was formed in 1987 following a campout by RAOU members at Dorrigo the previous year. Members of Birds Australia who are residents of the area of coverage are automatically members of the group. A quarterly newsletter is sent to members. Activities provided for members include meetings, a variety of field trips, bird surveys, and conservation projects.

Birds Australia Western Australia (BAWA) is the Western Australian regional group of Birds Australia.  BAWA was formed in 1943 and incorporated in 2001.  Members of Birds Australia resident in Western Australia are automatically members of BAWA.  BAWA maintains an office, Peregrine House, at Floreat, Perth.  It also publishes a quarterly newsletter, WA Bird Notes.  Activities provided for members include monthly meetings, a variety of excursions ranging from half-day outings to extensive campouts, bird surveys and conservation projects.

Wader Studies Group 

The Australasian Wader Studies Group (AWSG), established in 1981, is a special interest group of BirdLife Australia. It publishes a journal, The Stilt, usually twice a year, with occasional extra issues. Its mission statement is "to ensure the future of waders (shorebirds) and their habitats in Australia through research and conservation programs and to encourage and assist similar programmes in the rest of the East Asian–Australasian Flyway".

The AWSG organises the nearly annual series of North-West Australia Wader Expeditions, which use experienced international cannon netting teams to catch and study the very large numbers of migratory waders that visit the beaches of Roebuck Bay near Broome, Eighty Mile Beach and Port Hedland in north-west Western Australia.

AWSG Objectives
 To monitor wader populations through a programme of counting and banding in order to collect data on changes on a local, national and international basis.
 To study the migrations of waders through a program of counting, banding, colour-flagging and collection of biometric data.
 To instigate and encourage other scientific studies of waders such as feeding and breeding studies.
 To communicate the results of these studies to a wide audience through the Stilt, the Tattler, other journals, the internet, the media, conferences and lectures.
 To formulate and promote policies for the conservation of waders and their habitat, and to make available information to local and national governmental conservation bodies and other organisations to encourage and assist them in pursuing this objective.
 To encourage and promote the involvement of a large band of amateurs, as well as professionals, to achieve these objectives.

Awards
The organisation awards a number of regular prizes.

The Stuart Leslie Bird Research Award and the Professor Alan Keast Award are bestowed annually to postgraduate students of ornithology, with an emphasis on conservation applications. The Indigenous Grant for Bird Research and Conservation acknowledges the contribution of Indigenous Australians by facilitating their further engagement in research and conservation.

John Hobbs Medal
The John Hobbs Medal may be awarded annually for "outstanding contributions to ornithology as an amateur scientist". It commemorates John Hobbs (1923–1990) and was first awarded in 1995.

List of recipients
 1995 – Selwyn George (Bill) Lane
 1996 – Durno Murray
 1997 – Stephen Marchant
 1998 – Alan Leishman
 1999 – John Courtney
 2000 – Clive Minton
 2001 – Pauline Reilly
 2002 – no award
 2003 – Brian Coates
 2004 – Graeme Chapman
 2005 – Graham Pizzey
 2006 – no award
 2007 – no award
 2008 – Kevin Alan Wood
 2009 – Michael J. Carter
 2010 – Andrew Ley
 2011 – no award
 2012 – Mike Newman
 2013 – no award
 2014 – Lloyd Nielsen
 2015 – Lynn Pedler
 2016 – A.B. (Tony) Rose
 2017 - Ken Gosbell
 2018 - Andrew Barham Black OAM
 2019 - Dick (RM) Cooper
 2020 - Alan Stuart PhD
 2021 - Ian Arthur William McAllan

D. L. Serventy Medal
The D.L. Serventy Medal may be awarded annually for outstanding published work on birds in the Australasian region. It commemorates Dr Dominic Serventy (1904–1988) and was first awarded in 1991.

List of recipients

 1991 - Ian Rowley
 1992 - John Warham
 1993 - Hugh Ford
 1994 - Harry Recher
 1995 - Allen Keast
 1996 - Cliff Frith and Dawn Frith
 1997 - Penny Olsen
 1998 - Richard Zann
 1999 - Jiro Kikkawa
 2000 - (no award)
 2001 - John Woinarski
 2002 - (no award)
 2003 - Trevor Worthy and Richard N. Holdaway
 2004 - Andrew Cockburn
 2005 - Lesley Brooker and Michael Brooker
 2006 - Denis A. Saunders
 2007 - Michael Clarke
 2008 - Stephen Garnett and Gabriel Crowley
 2009 - Carla P. Catterall
 2010 - David Lindenmayer
 2011 - David Paton
 2012 - Richard Kingsford
 2013 - Ron Wooller
 2014 - Richard Loyn
 2015 - Stephen Debus
 2016 - Sonia Kleindorfer
 2017 - Sarah Legge
 2018 - Leo George Joseph
 2019 - Naomi Langmore
 2020 - Ralph Mac Nally
 2021 - Andrew F. Bennett

Publications 
Selection of publications:
 Australian Birdlife Newsletter
 Emu - Austral Ornithology scientific journal
 Handbook of Australian, New Zealand and Antarctic Birds (HANZAB, 7 volumes),

See also

Australian Bird Calls
Australian Field Ornithology
Australasian Raptor Association
Egg Collecting and Bird Life of Australia
Australasian Ornithological Conference
Birds of Australia

References

Further reading
 Robin, Libby. (2001). The Flight of the Emu: a hundred years of Australian ornithology 1901-2001. Melbourne University Press: Carlton.

External links

 BirdLife Australia

2011 establishments in Australia
Organizations established in 2011
Ornithological organisations in Australia
Nature conservation organisations based in Australia
Environmental organisations based in Australia
Non-profit organisations based in Victoria (Australia)
Bird conservation organizations
Protected area administrators of Australia
Environmental organizations established in 2012